Asian Highway 2 (AH2) is a road in the Asian Highway Network running  from Denpasar, Indonesia to Merak and Singapore to Khosravi, Iran. The route is connected to M10 of the Arab Mashreq International Road Network. The route is as follows:

Indonesia

Indonesian National Routes: National Route 4 (Bali Island) Denpasar — Jembrana Regency
 National Route 1 (Java Island) Banyuwangi Regency - Panarukan - Situbondo (Bondowoso) - Probolinggo - Sidoarjo - Surabaya - Lamongan — Tuban — Rembang - Pati - Kudus - Demak - Semarang - Kendal - Batang - Pekalongan - Pemalang - Tegal - Brebes - Cirebon - Indramayu - Pamanukan (Subang) — Cikampek — Karawang - Bekasi - Jakarta — Tangerang - Serang - Cilegon - Merak 
 National Route 20 (Java Island) Semarang — Surakarta
 National Route 10 (Java Island) Cikampek — Bandung

Toll roads:
 Bali Mandara Toll Road (Bali Toll Road)
 Trans-Java Toll Road, consist of:
  Jakarta–Tangerang Toll Road
  Tangerang–Merak Toll Road
   Jakarta–Cikampek Toll Road
  Cikopo–Palimanan Toll Road
  Palimanan–Kanci Toll Road
  Kanci–Pejagan Toll Road
  Pejagan–Pemalang Toll Road
  Pemalang–Batang Toll Road
  Batang–Semarang Toll Road
  Semarang City Toll Road
  Semarang–Solo Toll Road
   Solo–Kertosono Toll Road
  Kertosono–Mojokerto Toll Road
  Surabaya–Mojokerto Toll Road
  Surabaya–Gempol Toll Road
  Gempol–Pasuruan Toll Road
  Pasuruan–Probolinggo Toll Road
  Probolinggo–Banyuwangi Toll Road

Trans-Java Toll Road complements, consist of:
  Cipularang Toll Road
  Padaleunyi Toll Road
 Cileunyi–Dawuan Toll Road
 Solo–Yogyakarta Toll Road
 Kanci–Purwokerto–Cilacap Toll Road

Ferry:
 Port of Gilimanuk, Jembrana Regency
 Port of Ketapang, Banyuwangi Regency
 Port of Tanjung Priok, Jakarta

Singapore

 Clementi Road: West Coast Highway - Jalan Anak Bukit
 Jalan Anak Bukit: Clementi Road - PIE (Anak Bukit Flyover)
 Pan Island Expressway: Jalan Anak Bukit — BKE
 Bukit Timah Expressway: PIE — Woodlands Checkpoint
 Johor–Singapore Causeway

Malaysia

 EDL : Johor Bahru (CIQ checkpoint) —  Bakar Batu — Pandan
 NSE:  Johor Bahru (Pandan) —  Kulai — Batu Pahat — Muar — Ayer Keroh (Malacca) —  Seremban — Nilai (North)
 ELITE:  Nilai (North) — Kuala Lumpur International Airport (KLIA) — Bandar Saujana Putra — Putra Heights — USJ — Shah Alam 
 NKVE: Shah Alam — Subang — Damansara — Kota Damansara — Bukit Lanjan
 NSE: Bukit Lanjan — Rawang — Tanjung Malim —Tapah — Ipoh — Taiping — Butterworth (Penang) — Sungai Petani — Alor Setar Bukit Kayu Hitam

Thailand

 Route 41: Phatthalung — Chumphon
 Route 37: Pran Buri — Cha-am (Hua Hin Bypass)
 Route 338: Nakhon Chai Si — Bangkok Outer Ring Road (Concurrent with )
 Route 9: Bangkok Outer Ring Road — Bang Pa-in
 Route 32: Bang Pa-in — Ayutthaya (Bang Pahan) — Chai Nat  (Concurrent with ) (Merges again at Bang Pahan)
 Route 347 :Bang Pa In — Bang Pahan

Myanmar
 National Highway 4: Tachilek — Kengtung — Meiktila
 Yangon–Mandalay Expressway: Meiktila — Mandalay
 National Highway 7 (Concurrent with ): Mandalay — Tamu

India (Northeast)
 : Moreh — Imphal 
 : Imphal — Viswema — Kohima
 : Kohima — Chümoukedima — Dimapur — Nagaon — Doboka — Jorabat
 : Doboka — Jorabat
 : Jorabat — Shillong
 : Shillong — Dawki

Bangladesh

 : Tamabil — Sylhet — Kanchpur — Dhaka
 : Dhaka — Joydebpur
 : Joydebpur — Tangail — Elenga
 : Elenga — Hatikumrul
 : Hatikumrul — Bogra — Rangpur — Banglabandha

India (East)
 : Fulbari — Siliguri 
 : Siliguri — Panitanki
 : Panitanki — Mechi Bridge

Nepal
 Mahendra Highway: Mechi Bridge — Kakarbhitta — Pathlaiya — Hetauda — Narayangarh — Butwal — Kohalpur — Mahendranagar — Mahakali River

India (North)
 Mahakali River — Banbasa — Khatima
 : Khatima — Sitarganj — Rudrapur — Rampur — Muradabad — Amroha (Gajraula) — Hapur — Delhi
 : Delhi — Sonipat- Kurukshetra — Ambala — Jalandhar
 : Jalandhar — Ludhiana — Phagwara — Amritsar — Attari

Pakistan
 Wagah — Lahore
  Lahore — Okara — Multan — Bahawalpur — Rahim Yar Khan — Rohri
  Rohri — Sukkar — Jacobabad — Sibi — Quetta
  Quetta — Dalbandin  — Taftan

Iran
:Mirjaveh — Zahedan — Kerman — Anar
:Anar — Kashan — Qom
:Qom — Salafchegan
:Salafchegan — Saveh
:Saveh — Hamadan
:Hamadan — Kermanshah — Khosravi (      Arab Mashreq International Road Network)

References

Asian Highway Network
Expressways in Singapore
Roads in Myanmar
Highways in India
Highways in Indonesia
Roads in Iran
Highways in Malaysia
Highways in Nepal
Highways in Pakistan
Roads in Thailand
Highways in Bangladesh